The Urnerboden is a village in the high valley of Urner Boden, and also an alp and a small high Alpine permanent settlement in the Swiss canton of Uri. At  in length, it is believed to be the largest alp in Switzerland.

The Urner Boden is traversed by the eastern approach road to the Klausen Pass to the west, from the village of Linthal in the canton of Glarus. The Klausen Pass provides the only direct connection to the rest of the municipality of Spiringen and canton of Uri that lie to the west of the pass.

In summer, PostBus Switzerland operates a bus service which provides several daily return journeys to Linthal and Spiringen. Outside that period, a minibus service called the Urnerboden Sprinter provides three connections a day to Linthal.

References

External links
 

Geography of the canton of Uri